Robert David FitzGerald III AM OBE (22 February 1902 – 24 May 1987) was an Australian poet.

Biography
FitzGerald was born in Hunters Hill, New South Wales, a third-generation Australian of Irish extraction, and studied science at the University of Sydney.  He left before graduating, however, and followed in the footsteps of both his father and grandfather Robert D. FitzGerald by taking up a post as a surveyor. In the 1930s he travelled to Fiji where he worked the Native Lands Commission, surveying tribal boundaries, an experience important to his poetry. He spent World War II doing engineering surveys in New South Wales and working for the Australian Department of the Interior (from 1939 to 1965).

FitzGerald's poetry, together with that of Kenneth Slessor, was an important modernist influence on Australian literature of the late 1920s and 1930s, being at once more serious and more workmanlike than much of the poetry of the period.  Jack Lindsay wrote of them:

In later life, too, FitzGerald was influential, not only through his poetry but as a lecturer and reviewer. He died in Glen Innes, New South Wales, aged eighty-four.

Bibliography

Poetry collections

 To Meet the Sun (1926)
 The Greater Apollo : Seven Metaphysical Songs (1927)
 Moonlight Acre (1938)
 This Night's Orbit : Verses (1953)
 Southmost Twelve (1962)
 Robert D. Fitzgerald : Selection and introduction by the author (1963)
 Of Some Country : 27 Poems (1963)
 Forty Years' Poems (1965)
 R. D. Fitzgerald Reads From His Own Work (1971)
 Product : Later Verses (1977)
 Some Poems of R. D. Fitzgerald (1983)

Single poem volumes

 Heemskerck Shoals (1944)
 Between Two Tides (1952)
 The Wind at Your Door (1958)
 One Such Morning (1966)

Edited

 Australian Poetry 1942 (1942)
 Mary Gilmore (1963)
 The Letters of Hugh McCrae (1970)

Essays

 Of Places and Poetry (1976)

Criticism

 The Elements of Poetry (1963)

Drama

 Time Wasted : A Play (1926)

Awards
 1928 Panton Arts Club (UK), Festival of Arts and Letters Bronze Medal, winner for To Meet the Sun
 1938 Australian Literature Society Poetry Gold Medal winner for Moonlight Acre 
 1938 Australia's Sesquicentenary Celebration Long Poem Prize, winner for Essay on Memory
 1951 Officer of the Order of the British Empire for services to literature
 1952 Grace Leven Prize for Poetry winner for Between Two Tides
 1959 Grace Leven Prize for Poetry winner for The Wind at Your Door : A Poem
 1962 Grace Leven Prize for Poetry winner for Southmost Twelve
 1974 Robert Frost Medallion (now known as Christopher Brennan Award)
 1982 Member of the Order of Australia (AM) for services to literature

Notes

External links
R.D. Fitzgerald: Surveyor of the Literary Landscape, biographical essay by Rafe Champion.
 Reference Number: MS 4 Guide to the Papers of Robert D. FitzGerald Academy Library, UNSW@ADFA (Retrieved 13 August 2007)

1902 births
1987 deaths
Members of the Order of Australia
20th-century Australian poets
Australian male poets
ALS Gold Medal winners
20th-century Australian male writers